Loïc Le Ribault (18 April 1947 – 6 June 2007) was a French geologist and essayist. Löic le Ribault created the OS5 formula, which was called Silicium G5 in Europe and labeled as Orgono Living Silica in the United States.

Books 
 L’Exoscopie des quartz, Éditions Masson, Paris:1977, 
 Microanalyse et criminalistique
 Micropolis, 1998
 Le prix d'une découverte - Lettre à mon juge, 1998
 L'Irlande, un an plus tard, 2001
 Qui a peur de Loïc Le Ribault ?

Bibliography 
 Valérie Duby & Alain Jourdan, Loïc Le Ribault : Savant maudit ?, Favre, 2005, 
 John McPhee, Irons in the Fire, (1998).

Filmography 
 Mandat d’arrêt contre un chercheur, documentary, Satya productions, by Jean-Yves Bilien and Pantxo Arretz.

Notes and references

External links
http://www.loic-le-ribault.com/gb/home.htm
http://www.livingsilica.com/

1947 births
2007 deaths
20th-century French geologists
French male writers
Scientists from Brittany
20th-century French male writers